Radio Tandem is a local  broadcaster in South Tyrol, Italy. Located in the city of Bolzano, it has been on the air since May 1977 and is one of the oldest Italian independent radio stations.

External links
 Radio Tandem

1977 establishments in Italy
Mass media in Bolzano
Radio stations in Italy